Roberto Xavier Ibáñez Romero (born January 20, 1985 in Guayaquil, Guayas) is a judoka from Ecuador, who won the gold medal in the men's half lightweight division (– 66 kg) at the 2007 Pan American Games. He represented his native country at the 2008 Summer Olympics.

References
 sports-reference

1985 births
Living people
Ecuadorian male judoka
Judoka at the 2007 Pan American Games
Judoka at the 2008 Summer Olympics
Olympic judoka of Ecuador
Sportspeople from Guayaquil
Pan American Games gold medalists for Ecuador
Pan American Games medalists in judo
South American Games gold medalists for Ecuador
South American Games medalists in judo
Competitors at the 2006 South American Games
Medalists at the 2007 Pan American Games
21st-century Ecuadorian people